Bade Achhe Lagte Hain 2 (English: It all feels so good) is an Indian Hindi-language television romantic drama series that premiered on 30 August 2021 on Sony Entertainment Television. It is digitally available on Sony LIV. Produced by Ekta Kapoor under Balaji Telefilms, the show is a spiritual sequel or reboot version of the 2011 series of the same name. It formerly starred Nakuul Mehta and Disha Parmar. Since February 2023, it stars Niti Taylor, Randeep Rai, Pooja Banerjee and Leenesh Mattoo.

Plot

Cast

Main
 Nakuul Mehta as Ram Kapoor "RK" – Virendra and Swati's elder son; Lakhan's older brother. Priya's husband; Pihu and Prachi's father (2021–2023)(Dead) 
 Disha Parmar as Priya Ram Kapoor (née Sood) – Mahendra and Meera's second daughter; Sarangi, Maitri and Sandhya's sister; Raj's half-sister; Akshay's cousin; Ram's wife; Pihu and Prachi's mother (2021–2023)(Dead) 
 Niti Taylor as Prachi Kapoor – Ram and Priya's younger daughter; Pihu's younger sister; Raghav's best friend and love interest; Josh’s fiancé (2023–present)
 Randeep Rai as Businessman Raghav Arora – Prachi's one-sided lover; Pihu and Angad's best friend; Lakhan's former secretary; Josh's rival; Member Of ARP. He later became an architect and could pursue his dreams with Angad and Pihu's support after three years.  (2023–present)
 Pooja Banerjee as  Businesswoman Pihu Kapoor – Ram and Priya's elder daughter; Prachi's elder sister; Angad and Raghav's best friend; Member of ARP. She along with Angad, also supported Raghav in pursuing his dreams of becoming an architect for the past three years. (2023–present)
 Aarohi M. Kumawat as young Pihu Kapoor (2022–2023)
 Leenesh Mattoo as  Businessman Angad Shekhawat – Aditya and Vrinda's son; Pihu's one-sided lover; Member of ARP; Raghav's best friend and supporter in pursuing his dreams of becoming an architect for the past three years. (2023–present)

Recurring
 Hiten Tejwani as Lakhan Kapoor "LK" – Virendra and Swati's younger son; Ram's younger brother; Avni's ex-love interest; Monica's husband; Pihu and Prachi's uncle-turned-father figure (2022–present)
 Alefia Kapadia as Sarangi "Sara" Sood Arora – Mahendra and Meera's eldest daughter; Priya, Maitri and Sandhya's sister; Raj's half-sister; Akshay's cousin; Varun's former wife; Vikrant's wife; Ishaan's mother (2021–present)
 Ajay Nagrath as Aditya "Adi" Shekhawat – Ram and Priya's friend; Vrinda's husband; Angad's adoptive father (2021–present)
 Aanchal Khurana as Vrinda "Vri" Shekhawat – Ram and Priya's friend; Aditya's wife; Angad's adoptive mother (2021–present)
 Abhinav Kapoor as Vikrant "Vicky" Arora – Ram and Priya's friend; Twinkle's former husband, Sarangi's husband; Ishaan's step-father (2021–present)
 Shraddha Jaiswal / Tuhina Vohra as Monica Kapoor - Sanjeev and Mitali's daughter; Lakhan's wife; Mahir, Pihu and Prachi's aunt-turned mother-figure (2023–present)
 Jitendra Nokewal as Siddharth "Sid" Babbar – Sahil's younger son; Shashi's brother; Avni's husband; Josh and Kiara's father (2021–present)
 Ritu Chauhan as Avni  Babbar – Yash and Veena's daughter; Siddharth's wife; Lakhan's ex love interest; Josh and Kiara's mother (2022–present)
 Devashish Chandiramani as Josh Babbar – Siddharth and Avni's son; Kiara's brother; Raghav's rival; Prachi's fiancé (2023–present)
 Roshan Kapoor as Mahir – Monica's nephew (2023–present)
 Anurima Chakraborty / Sakshi Parihar as Kiara Babbar – Siddharth and Avni's daughter; Josh's sister; Raghav's One-Sided lover (2023–present)
 Mehak Ghai as Samaira Malhotra (2023–present)
 Amit Singh Thakur as Sanjeev Garewal – Nandini's brother; Mitali's husband; Monica's father; Shubham and Shivina's uncle (2021–present)
 Ritu Vashishtha as Mitali "Meetu" Garewal – Sanjeev's wife; Monica's mother; Shubham and Shivina's  aunt (2021–present)
 Manraj Singh as Shubham "Shubhu" Kapoor – Virendra and Nandini's son; Shivina's brother; Ram and Lakhan's half-brother (2021–present)
 Aishwarya Aher as Sanya (2023–present)
 Shubhaavi Choksey as Nandini Garewal Kapoor – Sanjeev's sister; Virendra's second wife; Shubham and Shivina's mother; Ram and Lakhan's stepmother (2021–2023) (Dead)
 Kanupriya Pandit as Meera Mehra – Dhirendra's sister; Mahendra's former wife; Sarangi, Priya, Maitri and Sandhya's mother; Raj's stepmother; Eshan, Pihu and Prachi's grandmother (2021–2023)
 Shalini Arora as Swati Kapoor – Virendra's first wife; Ram and Lakhan's mother; Pihu and Prachi's grandmother (2022–2023)
 Reena Aggarwal as Vedika Kumar – Ram's former girlfriend; Shashi's former wife (2021–2022)
 Piyush Sahdev as Krish Dixit – Priya's friend; Ram's private investigator (2022)
 Maanya Singh as Sandhya "Sandy" Sood – Mahendra and Meera's youngest daughter; Sara, Priya and Maitri's sister; Raj's half-sister; Akshay's cousin (2021–2022)
 Krushag Ghuge as Ishaan Arora – Sarangi's son; Vikrant's stepson (2022)
 Meet Mukhi as Teenage Eshan (2022)
 Pranav Misshra as Akshay "Akki" Mehra – Dhirendra and Sarika's son; Sarangi, Priya, Maitri and Sandhya's cousin; Shivina's husband (2021–2022)
 Sneha Namanandi as Shivina "Shivi" Mehra (née Kapoor) – Virendra and Nandini's daughter; Shubham's sister; Ram and Lakhan's half-sister; Akshay's wife (2021–2022) (Dead)
 Anjum Fakih as Maitri Bahl (née Sood) – Mahendra and Meera's third daughter; Sarangi, Priya and Sandhya's sister; Raj's half-sister; Akshay's cousin; Neeraj's wife (2021–2022)
 Aman Maheshwari as Neeraj Bahl – Priya's former boyfriend; Maitri's husband (2021–2022)
 Utkarsh Gupta as Kunal Jeet Baweja – Ram and Priya's friend (2021–2022)
 Abhay Bhargava as Mahendra Sood – Meera's former husband; Rakhi's husband; Sarangi, Priya, Maitri, Sandhya and Raj's father; Eshan, Pihu and Prachi's grandfather (2021–2022)
 Vineet Kumar Chaudhary as Shashwat "Shashi" Sahil Babbar – Sahil's elder son, Sid's brother; Vedika's former husband (2021–2022)
 Yajuvendra Singh as Yash Khanna – Veena's husband; Avni's father, Josh and Kiara's grandfather (2022–2023)
 Jyoti Tiwari as Veena Khanna – Yash's wife; Avni's mother, Josh and Kiara's grandmother (2022–2023)
 Puneet Panjwani as Minister – Kanika's husband (2022)
 Menka Rai as Kanika – Minister's wife (2022)
 Ajay Dutta as Mr. Arora – Vikrant's father (2022)
 Shantanu Monga as Varun – Sara's former husband; Ishaan's adoptive father (2022)
 Geetu Bawa as Rakhi Sood – Mahendra's second wife; Raj's mother; Sarangi, Priya, Maitri and Sandhya's stepmother (2021–2022)
 Ankit Shah as Raj "Bunty" Sood – Mahendra and Rakhi's son; Meera's stepson; Sarangi, Priya, Maitri and Sandhya's half-brother (2021–2022)
 Ajita Kulkarni as Sarika Mehra – Dhirendra's wife; Akshay's mother (2021–2022)
 Krishna Saajnani as Dhirendra Mehra – Meera's brother; Sarika's husband; Akshay's father (2021–2022)
 Poorti Arya as Twinkle Singh – Priya's friend; Vikrant's former wife (2021)

Guest appearances
 Pawandeep Rajan in the song "Bhangra Ta Sajda" and "Bade Achhe Lagte Hain" during Ram and Priya's Sangeet Party (2021)
 Arunita Kanjilal in the song "Bhangra Ta Sajda" and "Bade Achhe Lagte Hai" during Ram and Priya's Sangeet Party (2021)
 School of Kids Choir in the song "Bade Achhe Lagte Hain" during Ram and Priya's Sangeet Party (2021)
 Raftaar to promote the song "Ghana Kasoota" (2021)
 Rashmeet Kaur to promote the song "Ghana Kasoota" (2021)
 Darshan as Kids' Manager (special appearance)
 Sriimurali as Muralidhar Singh (special appearance)
 Prabhu Deva as IPS Dildar Pandey (special appearance)
 Sakshi Tanwar as Sheel Chaudhary, to promote Mai: A Mother's Rage (2022)
 Taapsee Pannu as Antara, to promote Dobaaraa (2022)

Production

Development
In May 2021, it was confirmed that Ekta Kapoor's show, Bade Achhe Lagte Hain which was originally broadcast from 2011 to 2014 will return with a fresh cast and different storyline.

Casting
Nakuul Mehta was finalized to play the male lead, Ram Kapoor. For the female lead Priya Sood, Divyanka Tripathi was approached who rejected the offer and eventually, Disha Parmar was signed by the makers. The show marks the second collaboration between Mehta and Parmar as they previously co-starred in Pyaar Ka Dard Hai Meetha Meetha Pyaara Pyaara (2012–2014).

In December 2022, Nakuul Mehta decided to quit the show. He said, "I feel, creatively, full having been a part of it for so long. The story is going to places and I feel going ahead there’s nothing new I can bring to it. I will miss playing Ram. I feel I have paid my dues to the makers and the audiences in the last 18 months."

In January 2023, Disha Parmar confirmed her exit. She said, "I would not say I'm quitting the show, but moving on to new projects and new beginnings. BAHL 2 was a great experience, and I enjoyed it thoroughly."

In January 2023 it was confirmed that show will take a generation leap. Niti Taylor, Randeep Rai, Pooja Banerjee and Leenesh Mattoo were cast as Prachi, Raghav, Pihu and Angad respectively.

Release
The first promo of the series was revealed and released by the show producer Ekta Kapoor on 12 August 2021 featuring Nakuul Mehta and Disha Parmar as Ram and Priya. The first look poster of the upcoming season of the series was unleashed by the show leads Disha Parmar and Nakuul Mehta, at the grand finale episode of Indian Idol 12. The show's premier date was officially announced on 19 August 2021.

Crossover
Bade Achhe Lagte Hain 2 and Appnapan – Badalte Rishton Ka Bandhan came together for an integration week, called "Mahasangam Saptah". The episodes revolved around Vikrant and Sara's wedding ceremonies, which took place in Meerut.

Reception

Critical reception
Letty Mariam Abraham of Mid-Day stated "Mehta and Parmar put their best foot forward as they carry the show on their shoulders." She also noted that if the series is "relatable without indulging in melodrama ... it may well surpass its original."

Gursimran Kaur of Times Of India stated "Nakuul Mehta steps into the shoes of Ram Kapoor beautifully. He does justice to his part. Disha Parmar takes the cake with her simplicity and genuinity."

Soundtrack

Bade Achhe Lagte Hain 2s soundtrack music is given by Lalit Sen and Nawab Arzoo. The theme song music is composed by R. D. Burman and sung by Shreya Ghoshal and Trijayh Dey.

Awards and nominations

See also
List of programs broadcast by Sony Entertainment Television

References

External links
 
 Bade Achhe Lagte Hain 2 on SonyLIV
 Bade Achhe Lagte Hain 2 on Sony Entertainment Television

Balaji Telefilms television series
Hindi-language television shows
Indian drama television series
Indian television soap operas
Sony Entertainment Television original programming
2021 Indian television series debuts